Spanish settlement of Puerto Rico  began in the early 1500s shortly after the formation of the Spanish state in 1493 (continuing until 1898 as a colony of Spain) and continues to the present day. On 25 September 1493, Christopher Columbus set sail on his second voyage with 17 ships and 1,200–1,500 men from Cádiz, Spain. On 19 November 1493 he landed on the island, naming it San Juan Bautista in honor of Saint John the Baptist.

The most significant Spanish immigration wave occurred during the colonial period, continuing with smaller numbers arriving during the 20th century to the present day.
The Spanish heritage in Puerto Rico is palpable today in its customs and many traditions, language, and in the old and new architectural designs.

First settlement
The first Spanish settlement, Caparra, was founded on 8 August 1508 by Juan Ponce de León, a lieutenant under Columbus, who later became the first governor of the island. The following year the settlement was abandoned in favor of a nearby islet on the coast, named Borinquen, which had a suitable harbor. In 1511, a second settlement, San Germán, was established in the southwestern part of the island. During the 1520s the island took the name of Puerto Rico while the port became San Juan.

Migration waves, 1500–1898

From the start of the conquest of Puerto Rico, Castilians ruled over the religious (Roman Catholicism) and political life. Some came to the island for just a few years and then returned to Spain. However, many stayed.

Among Puerto Rico's founding families were the Castilian Ponce de León family. Their home was built in 1521 by Ponce de Leon but he died in the same year, leaving "La Casa Blanca", or "The White House", to his young son Luis Ponce de León. The original structure didn't last long; two years after its construction a hurricane destroyed it and it was rebuilt by Ponce de León's son-in-law Juan García Troche. The descendants of Ponce de León's family lived in La Casa Blanca for more than 250 years when in 1779 the Spanish Army took control of it. Finally, the American military moved into La Casa Blanca in 1898. The southern city of Ponce is named after Juan Ponce de León y Loayza, the great-grandson of the island's first governor.

The Spanish heritage of Puerto Ricans comes from the many regions of Spain (including Canary Islanders, Asturians, Catalans, Majorcans, Galicians, Castilians, Andalusians, and Basques)

Canarian migration

The first wave of Canarian migration to Puerto Rico seems to be in 1695, followed by others in 1714, 1720, 1731, and 1797. The number of Canarians that immigrated to Puerto Rico in the first three centuries of Iberian rule is not known to any degree of precision. Still and all, Dr. Estela Cifre de Loubriel and other scholars of the Canarian migration to America, such as Dr. Manuel González Hernández of the University of La Laguna, Tenerife, agree that they formed the bulk of the Jíbaro, or white peasant stock, of the mountainous interior of the island.

The Isleños increased their commercial traffic and immigration to the two remaining Spanish colonies in America, Puerto Rico and Cuba. Even after the Spanish–American War of 1898, Canarian immigration to the Americas continued. Successive waves of Canarian immigration continued to arrive in Puerto Rico, where entire villages were founded by relocated islanders.
In the 1860s, Canarian immigration to America took place at the rate of over 2,000 per year, at a time when the total island population was 237,036. In the two-year period 1885–1886, more than 4,500 Canarians emigrated to Spanish possessions, with only 150 to Puerto Rico. Between 1891 and 1895 Canarian immigrants to Puerto Rico numbered 600. These are official figures; when illegal or concealed emigration is taken into account, the numbers would be much larger.

Immigration to Puerto Rico, 1800–1898
Immigration to the island caused the population to grow rapidly during the 19th century. In 1800, the population was 155,426 and the century ended with almost one million inhabitants (953,243), multiplying the population by about six times. The major impetus for the massive European immigration during the 1800s was the Spanish Crown's proclamation of the Royal Decree of Graces of 1815 (Real Cédula de Gracias), which led to the arrival of primarily Catholic immigrants from some seventy-four countries. Included were hundreds of Corsican, French, Irish, German, Scottish, Italian, Lebanese, Maltese, Dutch, English and Portuguese families moving to the island. Some countries were represented by only a few immigrants, e.g., fifty-one Chinese immigrants during this century. The country that still sent the most people was Spain.

From the start of colonization other groups from Andalusia, Catalonia, Asturias, Galicia, and Majorca had also immigrated, although the Canarian people formed the basis. Once the 19th century came, things changed drastically. According to Puerto Rican scholars such as Estela Cifre de Loubriel, who did extensive research on immigration patterns to the island, during the 19th century the greatest number of Spaniards that came to the island with large families were Catalans and Mallorcans.

The next regions with the largest number of immigrants were Galicia and Asturias, followed by the Canary Islands, the Basque Country and Andalusia. The Catalans, Galicians, Mallorcans, and Asturians typically arrived with large extended whole families. There were regions of the island that attracted some immigrants more than others which was mainly due to political or economic reasons.

Areas of settlement
Many Catalans, Mallorcans and Galicians joined the population of the interior, the west and the southern coast of the island (along with large numbers of Corsicans) because of their independent personalities and their desire to stay away from the San Juan area which was dominated by the Spanish. They felt more comfortable by maintaining some distance from San Juan. However, Asturians, Basques, Galicians and Castilians stayed in the capital and owned several businesses, such as banking, coffee and tobacco industry in the surrounding area. In the case of Ponce and Mayagüez the business ownership was dominated by Catalans, with other immigrant groups (see table) such as French, Italians and Germans being represented.

Twentieth and twenty-first centuries

Continuation of a Spanish presence
1898 didn't see the end of Spanish immigrants in the island. Although many left, the majority decided to stay. While they continued to be an influence, their numbers however, continued to steadily decline under the occupation of the United States. In 1897 a year before the US invasion, there were 19,686 Spanish-born which fell to 7,690 in the census of 1899. This trend continued into the following decades of the early twentieth century but with less intensity. For example, in 1910 there were 6,630 Spaniards which dropped to 4,975 in the 1920 Census. Even with these numbers, they still formed a majority of the total immigrant population with 56.5% and 60.9%. Immigration flows slowed because of laws by the United States government but large flows continued to other countries such as Argentina, Brazil, Cuba and Mexico which offered more opportunities. The majority of Spaniards lived in San Juan.

Note: Data in table excludes those born in the United States.

In 2009, there were 520 Galician-born people in Puerto Rico.

Language

Spanish is the predominant language inherited from the Spaniards among Puerto Ricans residing in the island; however, its vocabulary has expanded with many words and phrases coming from the  English, African, and Taíno influences of the island. Since 1901, English is taught in both public and private schools.

The linguistic contributions of Canary Islanders are difficult to separate from those of Andalusia, given considerable similarities as well as the close linguistic and cultural contacts between Andalusia and the Canaries. For example, the endings -ado, -ido, -edo often drop intervocalic /d/ in both Seville and San Juan: hablado > hablao, vendido > vendío, dedo > deo (intervocalic /d/ dropping is quite widespread in coastal American dialects).  Another Andalusian trait is the tendency to weaken postvocalic consonants, particularly /-s/: 'los dos > lo do, 'buscar' > buhcá(l).  Pronouncing "l" instead of "r" at the ends of words ending in "r" is also a trait of Puerto Rican Spanish that has its origin in southern Spain.

Canarian Spanish also made a contribution to Puerto Rican Spanish as many Canarios came in hopes of establishing a better life in the Americas. Most Puerto Rican immigration in the early 19th century involved Canary Islands natives who, like Puerto Ricans, had inherited most of their linguistic traits from Andalusia. Canarian influence is most present in the language of those Puerto Ricans who live in the central mountain region, who blended it with the remnant vocabulary of the Taíno. Canarian and Caribbean dialects share a similar intonation which, in general terms, means that stressed vowels are usually quite long. Puerto Rican and Canarian Spanish are strikingly similar. When visiting Tenerife or Gran Canaria, Puerto Ricans are usually taken at first hearing for fellow Canarians from a distant part of the Canarian archipelago.

Religion
The Catholic Church has been historically the dominant religious institution in Puerto Rico. The first diocese in the Americas was erected in Puerto Rico in 1511. All municipalities in Puerto Rico have at least one Catholic church (building), most of which are located at the town center or "plaza". Protestantism, which was suppressed under the Spanish regime, has been encouraged under American rule, making modern Puerto Rico interconfessional.

On 8 August 1511, Pope Julius II created two dioceses in La Española (Santo Domingo and Concepción de la Vega) and a third in the principal city of Puerto Rico, the bishops of which were all suffragans of the archbishopric of Seville. The Canon of Salamanca, Alonso Manso, born in Palencia, was appointed bishop of the Puerto Rican diocese and took possession in 1513 — the first bishop to arrive in America. The Island at that time had two Spanish settlements with 200 white inhabitants and 500 Christian aborigines.

The Roman Catholic Church in Puerto Rico is part of the worldwide Catholic Church, under the spiritual leadership of the Pope in Rome.

Present
Presently, Roman Catholics constitute 75% of the island's total population while adherents of Protestant, Pentecostal Christianity, Islam, Judaism, and animists make up the remaining 25%.

Cultural influences
Spanish influence is the most notable of all cultural influences in Puerto Rican culture. Spanish heritage has left an indelible mark on the island, and signs of this cultural exchange can be found everywhere, from the official language, musical genres to the local culinary styles.

Art

Francisco Oller was a Puerto Rican visual artist. Oller is the only Latin American painter to have played a role in the development of Impressionism. He was the third of four children of aristocratic and wealthy Spanish parents.

Bullfighting
Bullfighting was performed although it never became popular on the island. It was mainly performed in larger cities such as San Juan and Ponce. Be that as it may, it did have a short-lived rebirth in the 1950s and 1960s with bullfighting events performed in the Estadio Francisco Montaner as late as 1967, with others held in the Hiram Bithorn Stadium and Estadio Sixto Escobar in San Juan.
The first Puerto Rican bullfighter was Ernesto Pastor, the other being Juan Ramón Fernandez.

Cockfighting

Cockfighting is a tradition dating back more than five centuries ago with it being legal in Spain's Canary Islands, a major influence on Puerto Rico.  There is a cockfighting arena in every major town or city. Cockfighting had been legal in Puerto Rico since 1933 but in 2019, cockfighting was made illegal by the United States administration.

Cuisine

Arguably considered to be the Puerto Rican unofficial national dish, arroz con pollo, or "rice with chicken", is supposedly native to Puerto Rico. The dish has roots in the motherland of Spain. Arroz con pollo dates back to the eighth century when the Moors occupied Spain and influenced the way they imported and exported goods along with the way they ate. Among the other foodstuffs introduced by the Spaniards were beef, pork (chorizo), rice, wheat, and olive oil. Caldo gallego is a dish imported from Spain's northwestern province of Galicia.

National anthem

La Borinqueña is the national anthem of the Commonwealth of Puerto Rico. Two Spaniards, Félix Astol Artés and Manuel Fernández Juncos, wrote the official music (1867) and lyrics (1903) to the anthem. Astol Artés adapted the music of an earlier tune, "Bellísima Trigueña", while Fernández Juncos changed the lyrics to the piece in the early years of the 20th century, supposedly to suppress any zeal for political independence among the Puerto Rican people. 
This change in the anthem's lyrics was in reaction to the revolutionary lyrics penned by Lola Rodríguez de Tió, patriot and poet, at the time of El Grito de Lares in September 1868, the most important uprising against Spanish colonial rule in the history of Puerto Rico.

Official beverage
The world-famous piña colada is the official beverage of Puerto Rico since 1978. One claim to the creation of the piña colada was that in 1963 when Don Ramón Portas Mingot, a Spaniard, with a plaque in San Juan commemorating his creation of the beverage in La Barrachina, a restaurant bar.

Rum producers
Sebastián Serrallés was a wealthy Spaniard from Girona, Catalonia, who settled in Ponce in the mid-1830s and bought a small plot of land known as Hacienda "La Teresa". Eventually, Sebastián Serrallés left Puerto Rico for Barcelona and turned over the management of the growing estate to his Puerto Rico-born son Don Juan Serrallés Colón. In 1865, Juan Serrallés Colón (1845–1921) founded Destilería Serrallés, a rum producer located in Ponce, Puerto Rico, known for its Don Q (from Don Quixote) rum brand. Don Q is one of several rums made in the island archipelago. Five-generations on, it is still run by the Serrallés family over a century after its founding.

Spanish surnames

There are approximately 1,700 surnames in existence in Puerto Rico. Of these, the majority are of Spanish origin. After these, the most common ones are Corsican (Italian origin) with 8%. The remainder are of various origins. Thus, most surnames in Puerto Rico originated in Spain, with Puerto Ricans following the Spanish tradition of using two surnames. The first surname is inherited from the father's first surname and the second is inherited from the mother's first surname (maiden name).

The most common Puerto Rican surnames in 2014 (compared to the top surnames in Spain) are as follows:

Notable people

Entertainment 
Rita Moreno - maternal Spanish grandmother

Governors 

Most of the Governors of Puerto Rico have had Spanish ancestry, although the extent of Spanish heritage varies. Later ancestry can often be traced to ancestors from other nations in Europe.  They come from many regions within Spain, for example, at least three governors have origins in the Balearic Islands.
The first person Governor to officially occupy the position was Spanish conquistador Juan Ponce de León in 1508.

1898–1949
José E. Benedicto, 1921-1921 (interim governor)
José E. Colón, 1939-1939 (interim governor)
José Miguel Gallardo, 1940–1941 and 1941-1941 (twice interim governor)
Jesús T. Piñero, 1946–1949: (Canarian) descent.

1949 to present
Luis Muñoz Marín: (Great-grandfather, Luis Muñoz Iglesias, (born 1797) in Palencia, Spain).
Roberto Sánchez Vilella 
Luis A. Ferré Aguayo: (French), Maria Aguayo Casals (mother), was a cousin of Pablo Casals, a Catalan.
Rafael Hernández Colón (first term)
Carlos Romero Barceló: (Maternal Majorcan descent).
Rafael Hernández Colón (second term) 
Pedro Rosselló González: (Grandfather: Mallorca, Balearic Islands).
Sila María Calderón Serra: (Maternal Balearic origin). 
Aníbal Acevedo Vilá
Luis Fortuño Burset: (Catalan) roots from Mataró, Barcelona and Girona via Marín, Pontevedra, Galicia.
Alejandro García Padilla: Paternal Asturian (grandfather) descent.
Ricardo Rosselló Nevares: Paternal (Mallorcan descent).

Military 
Ángel Rivero Méndez

Models 
Mariana Vicente

Poets 
Luis Lloréns Torres

Singers / musicians 
Kany García
Ricky Martin

Sport 
Monica Puig of Catalan heritage.

Place names

There are many places in Puerto Rico named after places in Spain or have Spanish names due to the centuries of Spanish colonialism, Spanish settlers and explorers.

By municipality:
 Añasco – named after the Spaniard Don Luis de Añasco from Extremadura;
 Arroyo 
 Barceloneta – founded by the Catalan Don Bonocio Llenza Feliú and named after the Barcelona district of La Barceloneta or the city itself;
Cataño – founded in 1927 by Hernando De Cataño
 Isabela – named for Queen Isabela of Castile in 1819
Ponce – named for Juan Ponce de León y Loayza of the Ponce de León family
 Rincón – "Corner", founded by Don Luis de Añasco; 
 San Juan – from "Saint John the Baptist"
 San Germán – named after the queen consort of Aragon and second wife of Ferdinand II of Aragon, whom he married in 1506 after the death of his first wife, Isabella I of Castile. 
 San Sebastián – named after a resort town on the Bay of Biscay in northern Spain. 
Santurce district – Pablo de Ubarri Capetillo was granted the title of 'Count of Santurce' (which is the Hispanicized equivalent of Santurtzi) by the Spanish Crown. With his newly acquired title and influence, the district was renamed after his title.
Vieques 
Isabel Segunda – the "town of Vieques", named after Queen Isabel II of Spain.

See also

Cultural diversity in Puerto Rico
List of Puerto Ricans
Puerto Ricans
Spaniards
Spanish immigration to Cuba
White Puerto Ricans

References

Notes

External links
 Españoles en el Mundo: "Españoles en Puerto Rico". (videos)
 www.rtve.es Españoles en el Mundo: Puerto Rico Spaniards in Puerto Rico.

Ethnic groups in Puerto Rico
European Puerto Rican
Immigration to Puerto Rico
Social history of Puerto Rico
Puerto Rican people of Spanish descent
Spanish Caribbean
Spanish diaspora in North America
Spanish diaspora by country